Mario Cassano (born 8 October 1983) is an Italian former professional footballer who played as a goalkeeper.

Club career
Born in Vizzolo Predabissi, Lombardy, Cassano started his senior career at Serie D side Voghera, located at near-by province. In summer 2001, he joined A.C. Fiorentina and played twice for first team. In August 2002, after the bankrupt of La Viola, he joined Empoli F.C. which also located in Tuscany. After 3 seasons as backup goalkeeper, he joined Serie B side Piacenza, where he played as first choice except 2006–07 season behind Ferdinando Coppola (and also injured) and first season shared the role with Gabriele Aldegani. In 2009–10 season, he swapped club with Christian Puggioni, both joined the team on loan. In January 2010, Sampdoria signed Cassano on loan, due to the injury of their first choice Luca Castellazzi and sent Vincenzo Fiorillo to Reggina on loan. However, he worked as backup of Marco Storari, another new signing. At the end of the loan spell, he came back to Piacenza. Cassano was the first choice until December 2011. He was questioned by the prosecutor on 21 March 2012.

Cassano was banned from football in June 2012.

Italian football scandal
On 1 June 2012 the prosecutor requested to ban Cassano for 5 years due to involvement in 2011–12 Italian football scandal. It was suspected that the match AlbinoLeffe–Piacenza on 20 December 2010, Atalanta–Piacenza on 19 March 2011 were fixed. Eventually FIGC announced to ban him for 5 years on 18 June 2012.

International career
Cassano has capped for Italy U20 team, the feeder team of U21 team, which the coach also tested several other players. He also received several U21 call-up but did not play.

References

External links

AIC Football profile 
National team data 

1983 births
Living people
People from Vizzolo Predabissi
Italian footballers
Italy youth international footballers
Association football goalkeepers
Serie A players
Serie B players
Serie C players
Serie D players
A.S.D. AVC Vogherese 1919 players
ACF Fiorentina players
Empoli F.C. players
Piacenza Calcio 1919 players
Reggina 1914 players
U.C. Sampdoria players
Footballers from Lombardy
Sportspeople from the Metropolitan City of Milan